The 1973 Baltimore Colts season was the 21st season for the team in the National Football League. Under first-year head coach Howard Schnellenberger, the Colts finished with a record of 4 wins and 10 losses, tied for fourth in the AFC East with the New York Jets. The Colts lost the tiebreaker to the New York based on head-to-head series (0–2).

Baltimore was the only team to lose to the Houston Oilers, bowing 31–27 in week eight at home. The Oilers broke an 18-game losing streak with the victory.

Hired in February, Schnellenberger was previously the offensive coordinator with the Super Bowl champion Miami Dolphins, who went undefeated in 1972 under head coach Don Shula.

This was the first year since 1955 in which long-time quarterback Johnny Unitas was not on the Baltimore roster.

Offseason

NFL Draft

Staff

Final roster

Regular season 

Before the season, the Colts traded long-time quarterback Johnny Unitas to the San Diego Chargers. Unitas had been splitting quarterback duties with Earl Morrall and Marty Domres over the past few seasons; he played one season for San Diego and retired.

Schedule

Standings

References

See also 
 History of the Indianapolis Colts
 Indianapolis Colts seasons
 Colts–Patriots rivalry

Baltimore Colts
1973
Baltimore Colts